Zhang He was a military general in the Eastern Han dynasty of China

Other people with this name include:
Zhang He (figure skater), Chinese figure skater
Zhang He (politician), Chinese politician

See also
Zhang River
Zheng He